Rock Fort or Rockfort may refer to:

 Tiruchirapalli Rock Fort, a historic fortification and temple complex in India
 Thayumanaswami Temple, Rockfort, a 6th century Hindu temple
 Ucchi Pillayar Temple, Rockfort, a 7th century Hindu temple dedicated to Ganesha
 Rockfort (Kingston, Jamaica), a neighborhood on the eastern outskirts of Kingston
 Rockfort (Jamaica), a fort east of Kingston, Jamaica
 Rock Fort Campsite, a historic site where Lewis and Clark camped